Antipodean Resistance (AR) is an Australian neo-Nazi hate group. The group, formed in October 2016, uses the slogan "We're the Hitlers you've been waiting for" and makes use of Nazi symbols such as the swastika and the Nazi salute. AR's logo features the Black Sun and Totenkopf (death's head) with an Akubra hat, a laurel wreath and a swastika.

Antipodean Resistance promotes and incites hatred and violence, distributing racist, homophobic and antisemitic posters and propaganda. In 2018 its website was shut down by its hosting provider. ASIO, the Australian national security organisation, has been monitoring the group since at least 2017.

History 
Antipodean Resistance was formed on the now-defunct Iron March website, which was a far-right website describing itself as a fascist social network, and which appears to have been home to many white supremacists, neo-Nazis and other right-wing extremists. Members of the website formed groups such as Atomwaffen Division and Antipodean Resistance.

Racist vandalism 
AR has attracted attention for its Nazi-inspired vandalism in major cities in Australia. It has targeted schools in Melbourne with significant ethnic minority populations, placing posters carrying the message "Keep Australia White" along with racial slurs targeting Aboriginal and Torres Strait Islander people, Chinese Australians and African Australians which were described as "vile and disgusting" by Victorian education minister James Merlino. The group also placed a series of Chinese-language posters at universities threatening Chinese students with deportation.

Homophobic propaganda 
In the lead-up to the Australian Marriage Law Postal Survey AR targeted churches, universities and public places with homophobic propaganda linking same-sex marriage and paedophilia.

National Party of Australia ban 
In 2018, the NSW Nationals unanimously adopted a resolution banning 22 people for life after an investigation into alleged infiltration by people with links to neo-Nazi and fascist groups. The resolution also banned any party member from joining a number of specific organisations, including Antipodean Resistance.

Membership
The membership of AR is reported to be very small. The group is only open to young heterosexual white people, who are "able to take a hit" for their beliefs. Members assume a pseudonym in an attempt to remain anonymous. Media outlets have reported that AR have organised secret radicalisation camps in remote forests. AR has been banned from a number of social media and online hosting platforms.

Terrorism concerns
Several counter-terrorism experts have suggested authorities should focus more on far-right extremists such as Antipodean Resistance. Anne Aly, the Labor MP, in 2017 suggested that the group may turn to terrorism, stating "For a terrorist attack to succeed, it really only takes one person." She called for the group to be banned, stating "I would like to see some of these groups proscribed ... as terrorist and violent organisations."

It was reported in 2017 that ASIO, the Australian national security organisation, was monitoring the group, who were "willing to use violence to further their own interests."

See also
 National Socialist Network

References 

2016 establishments in Australia
Organizations established in 2016
Neo-Nazi organizations
Neo-Nazism in Australia